Limi is a locale in Nepal.

Limi may also refer to:
 Turu language, a Bantu language of Africa
 Limi language, a Loloish language of Asia